The following lists events that happened during 1960 in the Imperial State of Iran.

Incumbents
 Shah: Mohammad Reza Pahlavi 
 Prime Minister: Manouchehr Eghbal (until August 31), Jafar Sharif-Emami (starting August 31)

Events

 The magnitude 6 Lar earthquake causes 420 deaths in southern Iran.

Births

 7 January – Mohammad Javad Zarif.
 31 October – Reza Pahlavi.

See also
 Years in Iraq
 Years in Afghanistan

References

 
Iran
Years of the 20th century in Iran
Iran
1960s in Iran